Limoilou was a former provincial electoral district in Quebec, Canada. It was located in the general area of the city of Limoilou (today part of the La Cité-Limoilou borough of Quebec City).

It was created for the 1966 election from part of the Québec-Est electoral district.  Its final election was in 1998. It disappeared in the 2003 election, as nearly all of its territory and a part of Montmorency electoral district were merged to become the Jean-Lesage electoral district.

Members of the Legislative Assembly / National Assembly

External links 
Election results
 Election results (National Assembly)
 Election results (QuebecPolitique.com)
Maps
 1992–2001 changes (Flash)

Former provincial electoral districts of Quebec